Ravipuram is a region in the city of Kochi, in the state of Kerala, India. It is part of downtown Kochi. It is also one of the wealthiest localities in the heart of Kochi. The area consists with multi-national commercial establishments, important government offices, shopping malls, educational institutions, star hotels, restaurants, and cultural centers. It is also considered to the center of the city and nearest point connecting Ernakulam Junction Railway station.

Education Institutions
Traum Academy for German & French languages

Location